Yira, yira  is a 1931  Argentine film directed by Eduardo Morera.

References

External links
 

1931 films
1930s Spanish-language films
Argentine black-and-white films
1930s Argentine films